Queen's University Association Football Club is an intermediate, Northern Irish football club playing in the NIFL Premier Intermediate League.

History
The club, founded in 1910, a founder member of the Irish League B Division, is affiliated to Queen's University Belfast, and plays home matches at the newly built Arena at the Queen's University sports grounds, Upper Malone, Belfast - also known as "the Dub".

From 2003-2011, the club played its home matches at Newforge Lane, the home of PSNI F.C., while the new stadium at the Dub was being constructed.

The team play in white shirts and black shorts/socks. The away kit is all blue.

The University allows for a 25% non association with regards to playing staff whilst the other 75% are required to have studied, or be studying, at Queen's University Belfast.

On the 4 January 2020, Queens University recorded their greatest win in their history by defeating Linfield by two goals to one in the Irish Cup. Shayne Lavery cancelled out Marc McKenna's opener for Queen's and Jonah Mitchell scored the winner halfway through the second half.

Honours

Intermediate honours
Intermediate Cup: 1
2017–18

Junior honours
Collingwood Cup: 13+ 
1920, 1947, 1957, 1960, 1962, 1963, 1964, 1965, 1966, 1975, 1977, 1982, 1985

Current squad

References

External links
Queens University Football Club
Championship 2 Fixtures / Results / Table etc

 

Football
Football
Association football clubs established in 1910
Association football clubs in Northern Ireland
Association football clubs in Belfast
University and college association football clubs in Ireland
1910 establishments in Ireland
NIFL Premier Intermediate League clubs
University and college football clubs in Northern Ireland